Nguyễn Đức Uýnh (born 10 February 1955) is a Vietnamese sports shooter. He competed in the mixed 25 metre rapid fire pistol event at the 1980 Summer Olympics.

References

External links
 

1955 births
Living people
Vietnamese male sport shooters
Olympic shooters of Vietnam
Shooters at the 1980 Summer Olympics
Place of birth missing (living people)